David Carl Slee (born 30 November 1947) is a Welsh former footballer who played in the Football League for  Swansea Town. Went on to play for and manage the mighty Murton Rovers FC.

External links
 

Welsh footballers
English Football League players
Swansea City A.F.C. players
1947 births
Living people
Association football defenders